Sulaf Jalil (Arabic: سولاف جليل; born January 17, 1984) is an Iraqi actress, comedy artist and TV presenter, born in Baghdad in 1984. She holds a BA in Languages Institute.

Works
Jalil started her career at the age of ten, started in a children's TV series, and after that, she entered the drama and worked in the commercial theater and was her first play Shift baeny, directed by Imran Al-Tamimi  and worked in the theater until 2003, after which she appeared in several satellite channels. She has worked numerous tv works, and her first TV work was on the series Abu Al-Alaa Al-Maari.

Series
 (Akher almlok)
 (Waker altheb)
 (Aldarsalawol)
 (Altity)
 (Zaraq Waraq)
 (3 Vies)
 Al-Qadud

Plays
 (Play Shift baeny)

Sound performance
 Dalaa LLatfal

References

External links
 An Interview with Sulaf Jalil on Alrasheed TV
 

1984 births
Living people
People from Baghdad
Iraqi actresses
20th-century Iraqi actresses